The 2022 Food City 300 was the 26th stock car race of the 2022 NASCAR Xfinity Series, the final race of the regular season, and the 41st iteration of the event. The race was held on Friday, September 16, 2022, in Bristol, Tennessee at Bristol Motor Speedway, a  permanent oval-shaped racetrack. The race took the scheduled 300 laps to complete. Noah Gragson, driving for JR Motorsports, took advantage of the lead with 25 laps to go, and held off Brandon Jones for his eleventh career NASCAR Xfinity Series win, along with his sixth of the season, and his third win in a row. Gragson's teammate, Justin Allgaier, dominated most of the race, leading 148 laps and winning a stage. To fill out the podium, Austin Hill, driving for Richard Childress Racing, would finish 3rd, respectively.

12 drivers would qualify for the playoffs: Noah Gragson, Ty Gibbs, Justin Allgaier, A. J. Allmendinger, Josh Berry, Austin Hill, Brandon Jones, Jeremy Clements, Sam Mayer, Daniel Hemric, Riley Herbst, and Ryan Sieg. Allmendinger would also clinch the Regular Season Championship following the race.

This was the official debut race for CARS Pro Late Model Tour driver, Bobby McCarty. He was originally scheduled to make his debut at the New Hampshire race earlier in the year, but had failed to qualify.

Background 
Bristol Motor Speedway, formerly known as Bristol International Raceway and Bristol Raceway, is a NASCAR short track venue located in Bristol, Tennessee. Constructed in 1960, it held its first NASCAR race on July 30, 1961. Bristol is among the most popular tracks on the NASCAR schedule because of its distinct features, which include extraordinarily steep banking, an all-concrete surface, two pit roads, and stadium-like seating. It has also been named one of the loudest NASCAR tracks. The track is billed as the "World's Fastest Half-Mile", even though that designation technically belongs to the Volusia Speedway Park dirt track.

Entry list 

 (R) denotes rookie driver.
 (i) denotes driver who are ineligible for series driver points.

Practice 
For practice, drivers will be separated into two groups, Group A and B. Both sessions will be 15 minutes long, and was held on Friday, September 16, at 2:35 PM EST.

Qualifying 
Qualifying was held on Friday, September 16, at 3:10 PM EST. Since Bristol Motor Speedway is a short track, the qualifying system used is a single-car, two-lap system with only one round. Whoever sets the fastest time in the round wins the pole.

Race results 
Stage 1 Laps: 85

Stage 2 Laps: 85

Stage 3 Laps: 130

Standings after the race 

Drivers' Championship standings

Note: Only the first 12 positions are included for the driver standings.

References 

2022 NASCAR Xfinity Series
NASCAR races at Bristol Motor Speedway
Food City 300
2022 in sports in Tennessee